The Jeanneau One Design 24, also called the JOD 24, is a French trailerable sailboat that was designed by Daniel Andrieu as a one design racer and first built in 1994.

Production
The design was built by Jeanneau in France, starting in 1994, but it is now out of production.

Design
The Jeanneau One Design 24 is a racing keelboat, built predominantly of fiberglass. It has a 7/8 fractional sloop rig with a deck-stepped mast, a nearly plumb stem, a reverse transom an internally mounted spade-type rudder controlled by a tiller and a lifting keel with a weighted bulb. It displaces  and carries  of ballast.

A custom boat trailer for the design was a factory option.

The design has minimal accommodation for four people, consisting of two full-length settees, plus central stowage. A galley was a factory option.

See also
List of sailing boat types

References

External links

Photo of a Jeanneau One Design 24

Keelboats
1990s sailboat type designs
Sailing yachts
Trailer sailers
One-design sailing classes
Sailboat type designs by Daniel Andrieu
Sailboat types built by Jeanneau